Nacella magellanica is a species of sea snail, a true limpet, a marine gastropod mollusk in the family Nacellidae, one of the families of true limpets.

Description
The length of the shell attains 47 mm.

Distribution
This marine species occurs off Cape Horn, Chili.

References

 Rochebrune, A.-T. & Mabille, J., 1889 Mission scientifique du Cap Horn. 1882-1883. Mollusques, vol. 6, p. 128 p, 8 pls
  Nakano T. & Ozawa T. (2007). Worldwide phylogeography of limpets of the order Patellogastropoda: molecular, morphological and paleontological evidence. Journal of Molluscan Studies 73(1): 79–99
 Gonzalez-Wevar C.A., T. Nakano, J.I. Canete & E. Poulin (2011) Concerted genetic, morphological and ecological diversification in Nacella limpets in the Magellanic Province. Molecular Ecology 20: 1936-1951

External links
 Gmelin J.F. (1791). Vermes. In: Gmelin J.F. (Ed.) Caroli a Linnaei Systema Naturae per Regna Tria Naturae, Ed. 13. Tome 1(6). G.E. Beer, Lipsiae
 Reeve, L. A. (1854-1855). Monograph of the genus Patella. In: Conchologia Iconica, or, illustrations of the shells of molluscous animals, vol. 8, pls 1-42 and unpaginated tex. L. Reeve & Co., London
 Rochebrune A.T. de & Mabille J. (1885). Diagnoses de mollusques nouveaux, recueillis par les membres de la mission du Cap Horn et M. Lebrun, Préparateur au Muséum, chargé d'une mission à Santa-Cruz de Patagonie. Bulletin de la Société Philomathique de Paris. (7) 9(3): 100-111
 Strebel, H. (1907). Beiträge zur Kenntnis der Molluskenfauna der Magalhaen-Provinz. No. 5. Zoologische Jahrbücher, Abteilung für Systematik, Geographie und Biologie der Tiere. 25: 79-196
 González-Wevar C.A., Hüne M., Rosenfeld S., Nakano T., Saucède T., Spencer H. & Poulin E. (2018). Systematic revision of Nacella (Patellogastropoda: Nacellidae) based on a complete phylogeny of the genus, with the description of a new species from the southern tip of South America. Zoological Journal of the Linnean Society. DOI: 10.1093/zoolinnean/zly067

Nacellidae
Gastropods described in 1791